Severed Souls is Terry Goodkind's 17th novel. It is the 14th in the Sword of Truth series and the third novel in Goodkind's new Richard and Kahlan series, which takes off right after the end of the original Sword of Truth series.

Summary 
While Bishop Hannis Arc and the ancient Emperor Sulachan lead a vast horde of half people and undead into the heart of D'Hara, Richard and Kahlan must find a way to cure themselves from Jit's stain of death. Richard finds a message for him sent across time by the Magda Searus and Meritt. Eventually, in the unfolding of predestined events, Kahlan is killed and Richard gives up his own soul to try to get Kahlan back into the world of life.

Sequel
On January 11, 2015, Goodkind announced on Facebook that Warheart would be the sequel to Severed Souls and the final book in the series.

External links
 Official Terry Goodkind website

The Sword of Truth books
2014 American novels
2014 fantasy novels
American fantasy novels
Tor Books books